Before Night Falls is the 1992 autobiography of Cuban writer Reinaldo Arenas, describing his early life in Cuba, his time in prison, and his escape to the United States in the Mariel Boatlift of 1980. It received a favorable review from The New York Times and was on the newspaper's list of the ten best books of 1993. The book was adapted into a film of the same name in 2000, starring Javier Bardem and Johnny Depp.

Opera adaptation
On May 29, 2010, the premiere performance of Before Night Falls, an opera by Jorge Martín, took place at the Fort Worth Opera. The opera follows the book by Reinaldo Arenas closely.

On March 29, 2017, Florida Grand Opera premiered Before Night Falls in Miami with five performances at the Adrienne Arsht Center for the Performing Arts.

References 

1992 non-fiction books
Cuban books
Spanish-language books
Gay non-fiction books
Cuban-American literature
Literary autobiographies
Autobiographies adapted into films
Viking Press books
LGBT autobiographies